Okhotsk Airport  is a former military airbase in Okhotsk, Russia. It serves small transport aircraft.

Airlines and destinations

External links
 Airport Okhotsk Aviateka.Handbook

References

Airports in Khabarovsk Krai